Say syndrome is a condition characterized by bilateral acromial dimples.

In an article published in Humangenetik, Say et al. (1975) described a 'new,' presumably autosomal dominant disorder characterized by cleft palate, short stature, microcephaly, large ears, and hand anomalies.

See also 
 Rud syndrome
 List of cutaneous conditions

References

External links 

Genodermatoses
Genetic disorders with OMIM but no gene
Syndromes